Ron Perry may refer to:

Ron Perry (athletic director), former American athlete, coach, and athletics administrator
 Ron Perry (basketball, born 1943), former American basketball player for Virginia Tech and several American Basketball Association teams
 Ron Perry (basketball, born 1958), former American college basketball and baseball player at Holy Cross
 Ron Perry (music), American music executive